In mobile networks, an operation and maintenance center is the central location to operate and maintain the network.

There are various types of OMCs depending on the functionality:
OMC-B (for maintaining Node B)
OMC-R (radio. for maintaining RNC)
UMTS OMC-U
GPRS OMC-G
OMC-DO
OMC-IP

Telecommunications infrastructure